The Tagar culture was a Bronze Age archeological culture which flourished between the 8th and 2nd centuries BC in South Siberia (Republic of Khakassia, southern part of Krasnoyarsk Territory, eastern part of Kemerovo Province). The culture was named after an island in the Yenisei River opposite Minusinsk. The civilization was one of the largest centres of bronze-smelting in ancient Eurasia.

History
The Tagar culture was preceded by the Karasuk culture. They are usually considered a mixed population descended from peoples of the Afanasievo culture and Andronovo culture, who were themselves descended of migrants from the Pontic–Caspian steppe. The Tagar were part of the wider Scythian cultures. Along with the people of the Pazyryk culture, the Tagar are often considered to have constituted the core of the Scythian cultures. The Tagar culture was succeeded by the Tashtyk culture.

Research
The Minusinsk basin was first excavated by Daniel Gottlieb Messerschmidt in 1722. Messerschmidt and Philip Johan von Strahlenberg were the first to point out similarities between the Tagar and Scythian cultures further west. The first archaeological descriptions of the Tagar were made by Sergei Teploukhov. His periodization have formed the basis for later research.

Characteristics
The Tagar lived in timber dwellings heated by clay ovens and large hearths. Some settlements were surrounded by fortifications. They made a living by raising livestock, predominantly large horned livestock and horses, goats and sheep. Harvest was collected with bronze sickles and reaping knives. There are evidence of farming with evidence of irrigation.

The Tagar produced animal art motifs (Scythian art) very similar to the Scythians of southern European Russia. 

Perhaps the most striking feature of the culture are huge royal kurgans fenced by stone plaques, with four vertical stelae marking the corners. Burials from the early Tagar period are characterized as single burials. In the later Tagar period, collective burials become more common. This has been interpreted as a sign of social evolution in Tagar society.

Physical characteristics
The Tagar people have been the subject of numerous studies by physical anthropologists. The Tagars have been described by researchers as having Europoid features.

Genetics
In 2009, a genetic study of ancient Siberian cultures, the Andronovo culture, the Karasuk culture, the Tagar culture and the Tashtyk culture, was published in Human Genetics. Twelve individuals of the Tagar culture from 800 BC to 100 AD were surveyed. Extractions of mtDNA from ten individuals were determined to represent three samples of haplogroup T3, one sample of I4, one sample G2a, one sample of C, one sample of F1b and three samples of H (including one sample of H5). Extractions of Y-DNA from six individuals were all determined to be of Y-chromosome haplogroup R1a1, which is thought to mark the eastward migration of the early Indo-Europeans. Based on an analysis of 10 SNPs, the majority of Tagar individuals were classified as being primarily of European ancestry, with the exception of one mixed ancestry individual. Of the specimens yieleing a pigmentation phenotype, slightly more than half (5) were assigned blue eye color, while 4 were possibly blue or brown eyed. Most were assigned blond or light brown hair color.

In 2018, a study of mtDNA from remains of the Tagar culture was published in PLOS One. Remains from the early years of the Tagar culture were found to be closely related to those of contemporary Scythians on the Pontic steppe. The authors of the study suggested that the source of this genetic similarity was an eastwards migration of West Eurasians during the Bronze Age, which probably played a role in the formation of the Tagar culture.

A genetic study published in Nature in May 2018 examined the remains of eight individuals ascribed to the Tagar culture. The three samples of Y-DNA collected all belonged to haplogroup R1. The samples of mtDNA collected were N1a1a1a1,  N9a9,  H5a1, W1c, U2e2, A8a1, U2e1h and F1b1b. The Tagar had a higher amount of Eastern Hunter-Gatherer (EHG) ancestry than all other peoples of the Scythian cultures. They were determined to be of about 83,5% Western Steppe Herder (WSH) ancestry, 9% Ancient North Eurasian (ANE) ancestry, and 7,5% Siberian Hunter-Gather ancestry.

References

Sources

 

Archaeological sites in Russia
Archaeological cultures of Siberia
Iranian archaeological cultures
Khakassia
Nomadic groups in Eurasia
Scytho-Siberian world